Orosháza is a city situated in the westernmost part of Békés county, Hungary, on the Békés ridge bordered by the rivers Maros and Körös. Orosháza is an important cultural, educational and recreational centre of the region.

Main sights 

The city's main attractions are the Orosháza-Gyopárosfürdő spa complex, the Szántó Kovács János Museum, the Darvas József Literary Memorial House, and the Town Art Gallery. The only museum in the country devoted to water wells is found in Orosháza. At the Rágyánszky Arboretum, more than 2000 plant species in 6000 varieties can be seen.

The Lutheran church, was built between 1777 and 1830 in late Baroque style. It is located in the centre of the town. The bell carried by the first settlers, who migrated from Zomba, is kept in front of the altar of the church.

A number of cultural and entertaining programmes are organised in the town every year.

Notable residents 
 The cantor Marcel Lorand was born in the city in 1912. He learned music with Béla Bartók and became the cantor of the Synagogue de la Paix in Strasbourg, France, in 1964. He died in 1988.
 Júlia Goldman (b. 1974), was born in Oroshaza and is noted as an "outstanding writer" of fantasy and adventure.
 Gyula Gömbös, prime minister of Hungary was made an honorary citizen of the city in 1932.

Orosháza-Gyopárosfürdő spa complex
The Gyopárosfürdő dictrict of Orosháza is located 3 km from the city center. Gyopárosfürdő has been well known for its thermal water since 1869, which rises from a depth of 670 meters. Set in a 10-hectare park, the Orosháza-Gyopárosfürdő Thermal Spa, Park and Adventure Pools spa complex has 8 outdoor and 5 indoor pools, including adventure pools, thermal pools, children’s pools and even a 50-meter cold-water sports pool.

Official website: https://gyoparosfurdo-oroshaza.hu/en

Gallery

Twin towns – sister cities

Orosháza is twinned with:

 Băile Tușnad, Romania (1995)
 Carei, Romania (1991)
 Kuusankoski (Kouvola), Finland (1993)
 Llanes, Spain (1987)
 Panjin, China (2006)
 Srbobran, Serbia (2005)
 Zomba, Hungary (1994)

References

External links

  in Hungarian
 Orosháza at funiq.hu

Populated places in Békés County